Anaivadapathi is a village in the Kudavasal taluk of Tiruvarur district, Tamil Nadu, India.

Demographics 

As per the 2001 census, Anaivadapathi  had a total population of 1911 with 984 males and 927 females. The sex ratio was 942. The literacy rate was 73.03.

References 

 

Villages in Tiruvarur district
Villages in Kudavasal Taluk